"Ooh! My Soul", sometimes spelled "Oh My Soul", is a 1958 song by Little Richard. It first appeared on a May 1958 single, then on his eponymous second album. It was subsequently recorded by the Beatles in 1963 for the BBC,  and by Big Brother and the Holding Company in 1966.

The Beatles version
The Beatles recorded the song for a performance at the Playhouse Theatre in Manchester with McCartney on lead vocals. Their recording is shorter than Richard's version. The recording was unavailable until it was released officially on Live at the BBC.

Personnel
Paul McCartney – vocals, bass
John Lennon – rhythm guitar
George Harrison – lead guitar
Ringo Starr – drums
Personnel per The Beatles Bible

References

1957 songs
Little Richard songs
The Beatles songs
Songs written by Little Richard